He blew with His winds, and they were scattered is a phrase used in the aftermath of the defeat of the Spanish Armada in 1588, when the Spanish fleet was broken up by a storm, which was also called the Protestant Wind. The phrase seems to have had its origin in an inscription on one of the many commemorative medals struck to celebrate the occasion.

Background

The conflict had clear religious dimensions. Relations between Catholic Spain and Protestant England had been souring for a considerable period of time, eventually leading the outbreak of the Anglo-Spanish War in 1585. Events had been brought to a head by the English support of the Dutch Protestant United Provinces in the Eighty Years' War. The Dutch were revolting against Spain, and to prevent further English support, Philip II of Spain planned an invasion of England. On 29 July 1587, he obtained Papal authority to overthrow Elizabeth, who had been excommunicated by Pope Pius V, and place whomever he chose on the throne of England. 

An Armada, the Spanish word for a battle fleet, was prepared to invade England, defeat its armies and depose Queen Elizabeth. Consisting of around 130 ships, 8,000 sailors and 18,000 soldiers, 1,500 brass guns and 1,000 iron guns, it was termed the "Great and Most Fortunate Navy". The Spanish Empire at this time was one of the wealthiest and most powerful in the world. England in comparison was considerably weaker, both economically and militarily, and since becoming Protestant on the accession of Elizabeth, lacked powerful allies on the continent.

Defeat of the Armada

The Armada was subsequently defeated by the English fleet under the English admirals Lord Howard of Effingham (later Earl of Nottingham), Sir John Hawkins and Sir Francis Drake. The Armada was unable to pick up the Spanish army waiting in the Netherlands, and was forced instead to flee Northwards, around the East Coast of Britain, and attempted to return to Spain by sailing around the North coast of Scotland and around Ireland. Here, in addition to the usually rough seas, the ships ran into a heavy storm, sometimes described as one of the most northern hurricanes on record. Already in poor condition after an extended period at sea, many ships were sunk, or driven onto the Irish coast and wrecked. Over 50 ships were lost and the Armada ceased to be an effective force. The ships that returned to Spain were in poor condition and their crews weakened and diseased from the long journey.

Aftermath

Phillip's plans to invade England had been effectively quashed, the weather having played a large part. A later legend had him declared, "I sent my ships to fight against the English, not against the elements". The Spanish-English conflict was viewed all over Europe as a contest between Catholicism and Protestantism. The unlikely victory was viewed by the English as being proof of God's support for the Protestant cause, church services in thanks were held across the country and a number of medals were produced in England and the Dutch Republic to commemorate the event. 

It is a reference to the Book of Job 4:9–11 in the Vulgate Bible: ; the Elizabethan Bishops' Bible translation of which runs:

The inscription accompanied a scene of a fleet of ships on a stormy sea. Other medals included one that showed a wrecked galleon, and on the obverse some people praying.

Another large silver medal displayed a scene of some sinking ships on one side; on the other it satirized the Pope, King Phillip, and other clerics and rulers, who were shown with bandages over their eyes, and with their feet resting on a bed of sharp spikes.

Other medals used the Latin term for God, in the phrase , and featured on the obverse the biblical phrase of Matthew 2:18:

Queen Elizabeth is supposed to have awarded a medal to her admirals, bearing the phrase. The alternative term, "The Protestant Wind" is sometimes used, again to emphasise the divine nature of the victory.

The phrase, along with Elizabeth's speech to the troops at Tilbury, has become part of the popular mythology of the event, in a similar way that England expects that every man will do his duty has become a part of the national heritage after the Battle of Trafalgar. Altered and abbreviated versions of the phrase exist, such as God blew and they were scattered or God breathed and they were scattered.

References

 http://www.britainexpress.com/History/tudor/armada.htm
 http://www.loc.gov/rr/rarebook/catalog/drake/drake-8-invincible.html
 https://www.academia.edu/45550818/YHWH_blew_and_they_were_scattered_Flavit_%D7%99%D7%94%D7%95%D7%94_et_dissipati_sunt

English phrases
Anglo-Spanish War (1585–1604)
Exonumia